Forstera is a monotypic genus of Australian araneomorph spiders in the family Cyatholipidae containing the single species, Forstera daviesae. It was first described by A. Ö. Koçak & M. Kemal in 2008, and has only been found in Australia.

References

Cyatholipidae
Spiders described in 1988
Spiders of Australia